Suzanne Freriks (born September 16, 1984 in Uden, North Brabant) was a volleyball player from the Netherlands, who played as a setter. She was a member of the Dutch National Women's Team that won the gold medal at the FIVB World Grand Prix 2007 in Ningbo, PR China.

References
FIVB profile

1984 births
Living people
Dutch women's volleyball players
People from Horst aan de Maas
Sportspeople from Limburg (Netherlands)